Kinkaku-ji, or Temple of the Golden Pavilion, is a Buddhist temple in Kyoto, Japan, made famous in 1950 when it was destroyed by arson after surviving World War II intact.

Temple of the Golden Pavilion or Golden Pavilion Temple may also refer to:
 Jinge Temple, a Buddhist temple in Shanxi, China
 Kinkaku-ji replica in the Kyoto Gardens of Honolulu Memorial Park
 Kinkaku-ji (novel), a 1956 novel written by Yukio Mishima which is loosely based on the 1950 destruction of Kinkaku-ji
 Enjo (English language release title: The Temple of the Golden Pavilion), a 1958 film directed by Kon Ichikawa based on the Mishima novel
 Kinkaku-ji, a 1976 film directed by Yoichi Takabayashi based on the Mishima novel
 Kinkaku-ji (German: Der Tempelbrand), a 1976 German language opera composed by Toshiro Mayuzumi based on the Mishima novel
 Kinkaku-ji (English language release title: Golden Pavilion Temple), a Japanese pornographic film series produced by VIP, notable for the performance of AV idol Rui Sakuragi in second film in the series

See also
Kon-dō, a Japanese term referring to the main hall of a Buddhist temple complex which is typically translated into English as "golden hall"
Golden Temple (disambiguation)